Viñamar Airport ,  is an airstrip serving the Viñamar winery southeast of Casablanca, a city in the Valparaíso Region of Chile.

There is a ridge  short of the approach threshold of Runway 36.

See also

Transport in Chile
List of airports in Chile

References

External links
OpenStreetMap - Viñamar
OurAirports - Viñamar
FallingRain - Viñamar Airport

Airports in Chile
Airports in Valparaíso Region